Naso reticulatus, the  reticulate unicornfish, is a fish found on temperate coral reefs around Taiwan and Indonesia.

References

Naso (fish)
Fish described in 2001